The second season of the animated sitcom Bob's Burgers began airing on Fox in the United States on , and concluded on . The season was produced by Wilo Productions and Buck & Millie Productions in association with 20th Century Fox Television, and is distributed by 20th Century Fox Home Entertainment, along with its other seasons. Actors H. Jon Benjamin, John Roberts, Dan Mintz, Eugene Mirman and Kristen Schaal reprised their roles as Bob Belcher, Linda Belcher, Tina Belcher, Gene Belcher and Louise Belcher. These characters are all a part of the Belcher family, a nuclear family that runs a hamburger restaurant titled Bob's Burgers. The series started using Toon Boom Harmony instead of Adobe Flash.

Production
FOX renewed the show for a second production cycle consisting of thirteen episodes on April 7, 2011, and picked up the back nine on October 31, 2011, bringing the cycle to a total of 22 episodes. Only nine of the episodes aired during the second season, with the remaining 13 episodes being held for the third season of the show.

Like the previous season, the second season aired in the competitive timeslot at 8:30 p.m. on Sundays. The season premiere, "The Belchies", obtained 4.04 million viewers in the United States. The season finale, "Beefsquatch", obtained 3.57 million viewers in the United States, slightly down from the season premiere. All of these ratings are measured by Nielsen ratings.

Bob's Burgers ended its second season with a per episode average of 4.18 million total viewers and a 2.3 ratings share in the 18–49 demographic. The season was generally well received by television critics. Most agreed that the second season was a considerable improvement over the first season of the series, particularly "Moody Foodie", "Burgerboss", and "Bob Day Afternoon". Rowan Kaiser of The A.V. Club claimed that "after an uneven start, Bob's Burgers is becoming one of television’s best comedies!"

On May 7, 2013, Amazon.com released the season for purchase on "Burn-On-Demand DVD-R. The sole bonus feature is a table read of the season 3 episode An Indecent Thanksgiving Proposal.

Broadcast and reception

Ratings
The second season of Bob's Burgers originally premiered on March 11, 2012 in the United States on the Fox network between 8:30 p.m. and 9:00 p.m., with "The Belchies", and obtained 4.04 million viewers in the United States. They are all of episodes which are part of Fox's Animation Domination television block. It was preceded by The Simpsons at 8:00 p.m., and was followed by Family Guy at 9:00 p.m. The season finale, "Beefsquatch", obtained 3.57 million viewers in the United States.

Despite its middling ratings, Bob's Burgers was renewed for a third season, on May 14, 2012, alongside the cancellation of Napoleon Dynamite.

Critical response
The second season of Bob's Burgers was well received by television critics, particularly "Moody Foodie", "Burgerboss", and "Bob Day Afternoon". It received a "78 out of 100" on aggregate site Metacritic. Rowan Kaiser of The A.V. Club claimed that "after an uneven start, Bob's Burgers is becoming one of television's best comedies!". Alan Sepinwall of HitFix claimed that "the season's first two episodes aren't as consistently funny as last spring's best outings, but they do a good job of showcasing both the style of Bob's Burgers and the deep roster of characters the show has already assembled". Sepinwall claimed that it was "strange, and I often like strange in my comedy, but at least initially, I didn't find it funny. But it was compelling in its weirdness — one early episode had the family becoming obsessed with the cow a protest filmmaker had parked outside their restaurant — and that kept me watching until the rest of the show clicked for me". Maureen Ryan of The Huffington Post stated that "an animated comedy that is propelled by a very strong voice cast and by its own daffy comedic momentum", and compared it to Breaking In. Chris Cabin of The Slant Magazine called the season "improbably poignant". Cabin also claimed that it "possesses an unmistakable love for underdogs and odd ducks". Clark Collis of Entertainment Weekly noted that "While the show's attempt to please different generations is sometimes more jarring than jocular, this episode does feature the best non sequitur gag you're ever likely to hear about the Parliament song "Aqua Boogie"".

International broadcast
The season was first broadcast on the Global Television Network in Canada on March 11, 2012, between 8:30 p.m. and 9:00 p.m., as part of the Animation Rules comedy television block. It has the same schedule as the Fox network for the season. In the United Kingdom, the season premiered on May 1, 2012, at 10:30 p.m., on E4, (it is shown after the other FOX animated series, The Cleveland Show).

Episodes

References

External links
 
 
 

2012 American television seasons
Bob's Burgers seasons